Filipe Ribeiro de Meneses (born in 1969 in Lisbon) is a Portuguese historian, who has lived in Ireland since he was young. He is a professor in Maynooth University, whose historiographical production is predominantly centered around the contemporary history of Portugal.

He graduated with a B.A. in history and philosophy in 1992 and received his doctorate in 1997, both from Trinity College Dublin. His doctoral thesis dealt with the governments of the Sacred União and Sidónio Pais. In 2017 he was elected a member of the Royal Irish Academy.

Works 
 (2001). Franco and the Spanish Civil War. Londres y Nueva York: Routledge.
 (2004). Portugal 1914–1926. From the First World War to Military Dictatorship. Bristol: Hispanic, Portuguese and Latin American Monographs.
 (2010). Salazar: A Political Biography. Nueva York: Enigma Books.
 (2015). A Grande Guerra de Afonso Costa. Lisboa: Publicações Dom Quixote.

References

1969 births
Living people
Academics of Maynooth University
Alumni of Trinity College Dublin
21st-century Irish historians
Members of the Royal Irish Academy
Portuguese emigrants to Ireland